Aino Elina Salo (born 9 March 1936 in Sipoo, Finland) is a Finnish film, theatre and television actress who has also done work in radio as a voice actor in children’s programming. In her career that began in 1956, Salo has appeared in over 50 films and television shows and is known for her appearances in several Aki Kaurismäki’s films. She was also the voice of Little My in the Finnish dub of Moomin.

Salo has received three Jussi Awards for her work. In 2010, she received the Ordre des Arts et des Lettres (Commandeur).

Salo lives mainly in France.

Partial filmography 
 Skandaali tyttökoulussa (1960)
 Inspector Palmu's Mistake (1960)
 Gas, Inspector Palmu! (1961)
 The Diary of a Worker (1967)
 Harry Munter (1970)
 Gangsterfilmen (1974)
 Poet and Muse (1978)
 Herr Puntila and His Servant Matti (1979)
 Hamlet Goes Business (1987)
 The Match Factory Girl (1990)
 Take Care of Your Scarf, Tatiana (1994)
 Drifting Clouds (1996)
 Juha (1999)
 The Man Without a Past (2002)
 Le Havre (2011)

References

External links
 

1936 births
Living people
People from Sipoo
20th-century Finnish actresses
Commandeurs of the Ordre des Arts et des Lettres
21st-century Finnish actresses
Finnish film actresses
Finnish stage actresses
Finnish television actresses
Finnish voice actresses
Finnish expatriates in France